Angus North and Mearns (Gaelic: Aonghas a Tuath agus a' Mhaoirne) is a constituency of the Scottish Parliament (Holyrood) covering parts of the council areas of Angus and Aberdeenshire. It elects one Member of the Scottish Parliament (MSP) by the first past the post method of election. It is one of ten constituencies in the North East Scotland electoral region, which elects seven additional members, in addition to the ten constituency MSPs, to produce a form of proportional representation for the region as a whole.

The seat was created for the 2011 Scottish Parliament election and covers areas that were in the seats of Angus, Tayside North and West Aberdeenshire and Kincardine. It has been held by Mairi Gougeon of the Scottish National Party since the 2016 Scottish Parliament election.

Electoral region

The other nine constituencies of the North East Scotland region are Aberdeen Central, Aberdeen Donside, Aberdeen South and North Kincardine, Aberdeenshire East, Aberdeenshire West, Angus South, Banffshire and Buchan Coast, Dundee City East and Dundee City West.

The region covers all of the Aberdeen City council area, the Aberdeenshire council area, the Angus council area, the Dundee City council area and part of the Moray council area.

Constituency boundaries and council area 

Angus North and Mearns covers parts of the council areas of Aberdeenshire and Angus. Angus is represented by two constituencies in the Scottish Parliament, the other constituency being Angus South. Aberdeenshire is represented by four other constituencies in the Scottish Parliament: Aberdeenshire East and Aberdeenshire West are both entirely within Aberdeenshire; Aberdeen South and North Kincardine also includes a portion of Aberdeen City; Banffshire and Buchan Coast  also includes a portion of the Moray council area.

The electoral wards used in the creation of Angus North and Mearns are:

In full: 
Mearns (Aberdeenshire)
Brechin and Edzell (Angus)
Forfar and District (Angus)
Montrose and District (Angus)
In part:
Stonehaven and Lower Deeside (Aberdeenshire); shared with Aberdeenshire West

Member of the Scottish Parliament

Election results

2020s

2010s

References

External links

Scottish Parliament constituencies and regions from 2011
Politics of Angus, Scotland
Constituencies of the Scottish Parliament
Constituencies established in 2011
2011 establishments in Scotland
Stonehaven
Montrose, Angus
Laurencekirk
Brechin
Forfar
Politics of Aberdeenshire